John David Batton (February 13, 1911 – February 10, 1981), was from 1952 to 1964 the sheriff of his native Webster Parish in northwestern Louisiana. He was defeated after three terms by O. H. Haynes Jr., a fellow Democrat and the son of the sheriff, O. H. Haynes Sr., whom Batton had himself unseated twelve years earlier.

Law-enforcement career

Webster Parish Sheriff

Shortly after his first reelection, Batton was named one of seventeen directors of the Webster Parish Citizens' Council, a body which sought to prevent school desegregation.  Others in the council were the mortician Ed Kleinegger, Tax Assessor Richard B. Garrison, and the Minden High School principal, W. W. Williams.

References

1911 births
1981 deaths
Louisiana sheriffs
American municipal police chiefs
Louisiana Democrats
Politicians from Minden, Louisiana
Citizens' Councils
Minden High School (Minden, Louisiana) alumni
Baptists from Louisiana
Burials at Gardens of Memory Cemetery (Minden, Louisiana)
20th-century American politicians
20th-century Baptists